This is a timeline documenting the events of heavy metal in the year 1978.

Newly formed bands 

 Ángeles del Infierno
  Amebix
 Anvil
 Blind Illusion
 Bodine
 E.F. Band
 Earthshaker
 Electric Sun
 Exciter
 Fist
Fortune
 Gamma
 Gillan
 Girlschool
Grand Prix
 Leño
 London
 Yngwie Malmsteen
 Mama's Boys
Messiah Prophet
New England
 The Next Band
 Nightwing
 Pagan Altar
Pendragon
 Plasmatics
 Savage
Survivor 
 Trespass  
 Tygers of Pan Tang
Vanexa
 Venom
 Whitesnake
 Wild Horses
 Wrathchild America

Albums

January

February

April

May

June

August

September

October

November

December

Release date unknown
 Ram Jam - Portrait of the Artist as a Young Ram
 Shakin' Street - Vampire Rock

Disbandments 
 Lone Star

Events 
 Def Leppard's drummer Rick Allen joins at 15 as a permanent member.
 The Who's Keith Moon dies of a drug overdose at 32.

References

1970s in heavy metal music
Metal